Tadataka (written: 隆忠, 忠敬, 忠教 or 忠崇) is a masculine Japanese given name. Notable people with the name include:

, Japanese kugyō
, Japanese daimyō
, Japanese cartographer
, Japanese samurai

Japanese masculine given names